Municipal Building, also known as Old City Hall, is a historic city hall building located at Oneonta in Otsego County, New York. It is three story masonry building with an ornate facade of painted brick and terra cotta, built in 1906 in the Beaux-Arts style.  A central tetrastyle pavilion in the Ionic order dominates the upper floors.  In 1978 a neocolonial clock tower was erected on the roof.  It housed the municipal government until 1980, when they moved to the Old Post Office building.

It was listed on the National Register of Historic Places in 1982. It is located within the Oneonta Downtown Historic District established in 2003.

References

Government buildings on the National Register of Historic Places in New York (state)
Beaux-Arts architecture in New York (state)
Government buildings completed in 1906
Buildings and structures in Otsego County, New York
National Register of Historic Places in Otsego County, New York
Individually listed contributing properties to historic districts on the National Register in New York (state)
1906 establishments in New York (state)